Edwin Harley (born July 17, 1849) was an actor in minstrel shows and later in silent films. He worked for the Reliance Majestic Company, Lasky Film Company, Albuquerque Film Company, Crown City Film Company, and Fine Arts Film Company.

Filmography

Treasure Island (1918)
The Stain of Chuckawalla (Short) 
Susan Rocks the Boat  (1916)
Martha's Vindication (1916)
Blackbirds (1915)
The Wayward Son (1915 film)
The Girl of the Golden West (1915)
The Friends of the Sea (1915), short
Jack Chanty (1915 film)
The Law of Duty (1915), (Short) 
As in the Days of Old (1915), short 
The Fatal Hour (1915), short
The Right to Live (1915), short 
A Night's Adventure (1915), short
The Hoosier Schoolmaster (1914) 
A Father's Heart (1914), short

References

American male silent film actors
20th-century American male actors
1849 births
20th-century deaths
Year of death missing